Aerosmith is the debut studio album by the American rock band Aerosmith, released on January 5, 1973, by Columbia Records. "Dream On", originally released as a single in 1973, became an American top ten hit when re-released on 27 December 1975. The album peaked at number 21 on the US Billboard 200 album chart in 1976.

Background 
After entering a partnership with Frank Connelly, David Krebs and Steve Leber invited members of two record labelsAtlantic Records and Columbia Recordsto view an Aerosmith concert at Max's Kansas City. Clive Davis, the president of Columbia, was impressed with the band and Aerosmith signed with Columbia in the summer of 1972.

Although lead singer Steven Tyler had been in several previous groups, most of the band members had never been in a studio before. The band was heavily influenced by many of the British blues/rock bands of the 1960s, including the Rolling Stones, the Beatles, Led Zeppelin, the Yardbirds, and Peter Green's Fleetwood Mac.

Composition 
"Dream On" was also written by Tyler and became Aerosmith's first major hit and classic rock radio staple. The single peaked at number 59 nationally but hit big in the band's native Boston, where it was the number 1 single of the year on the less commercial top 40 station, WVBZ-FM, number 5 for the year on highly rated Top 40 WRKO-AM, and number 16 on heritage Top 40 WMEX-AM. The album version of "Dream On" (4:28, as opposed to the 3:25 1973 45rpm edit) was re-issued late in 1975, debuting at number 81 on January 10, 1976, breaking into the Top 40 on February 14 and peaking at number 6 on the Billboard Hot 100 national chart on April 10. Columbia chose to service Top 40 radio stations with a re-issue of the 3:25 edited version, thus, many 1976 Pop Radio listeners were exposed to the group's first Top 10 effort through the 45 edit. The song is famous for its building climax to showcase Tyler's trademark screams. It was written on piano but the recording contains a two-guitar arrangement, with guitarist Brad Whitford explaining to Guitar Worlds Alan Di Perna in 1997, "The idea was just to transcribe what Steven was doing with his left and right hands on the piano." The song is composed in the key of F minor.

In the authorized Stephen Davis band memoir Walk This Way, Tyler speaks at length about the origins of the songs:

"Make It" – "I wrote 'Make It' in a car driving from New Hampshire to Boston. There's that hill you come to and see the skyline of Boston, and I was sitting in the backseat thinking, What would be the greatest thing to sing for an audience if we were opening up for the... Stones? What would the lyrics say?"
"Somebody" – "'Somebody' grew out of a lick that our roadie Steve Emsback used to play on his guitar during the days of William Proud. I grabbed it and wrote the lyrics."
"Dream On" – "The music for 'Dream On' was originally written on a Steinway upright piano in the living room of Trow-Rico Lodge in Sunapee, maybe four years before Aerosmith even started. I was seventeen or eighteen... It was just this little thing I was playing, and I never dreamed it would end up as a real song or anything... It's about dreaming until your dreams come true."
"One Way Street" – "'One Way Street' was written on piano at 1325 [the street number of the house where the band lived], with rhythm and the [harmonica] coming from 'Midnight Rambler.'"
"Mama Kin" – "One day I grabbed this old guitar Joey Kramer found in the garbage on Beacon Street, an acoustic with no strings. It had snow on it and was so warped you could shoot arrows with it. I wedged it between the door and let it dry for a week. I looked at it for about two days, put four strings on it, which was all it would take because it was so warped... I stole the opening lick from an old Blodwyn Pig song."
"Write Me a Letter" – "'Write Me' was originally 'Bite Me,' something we'd been working on for five or six months starting in the Bruins' dressing room at the Boston Garden, but it just didn't make it. Then one day I said, 'Fuck this,' said something to Joey, who started playing like a can-can rhythm thing, and suddenly there it was."
"Movin' Out" – "'Movin' Out' was the first song I wrote with Joe, the first experience of coming up with something and saying, 'See? I can do it.'"

Recording 
The group recorded their debut album at Intermedia Studios in 331 Newbury Street, Boston, Massachusetts with record producer Adrian Barber. For the most part, the production is sparse and dry: two guitars, bass, drums, a singer, and occasionally piano. The most unusual feature of the album is how different Tyler sounds compared to the albums that followed. In his autobiography Tyler recalls, "The band was very uptight. We were so nervous that when the red recording light came on we froze. We were scared shitless. I changed my voice into the Muppet, Kermit the Frog, to sound more like a blues singer." In 1997 the singer told Stephen Davis, "Yes, I changed my voice when we did the final vocals. I didn't like my voice, the way it sounded. I was insecure, but nobody told me not to." Tyler added that producer Adrian Barber was "good for his time" but it was like "being with a retarded child in there, and I'm not sure if it was because he was so high, or because we all were." In his autobiography Rocks, Joe Perry is more critical of Barber:

Bassist Tom Hamilton later confessed, "The album was done so fast I barely remember anything but overdubbing some tracks and running to the bathroom for a hit of blow". Perry reflected, "We were uptight, afraid to make mistakes... We were total novices with no idea what to go for."  The collection also includes a cover of the Rufus Thomas hit "Walking the Dog," also covered by the Rolling Stones on their first LP.

Album cover 
On the original cover, the song "Walkin' the Dog" was misprinted as "Walkin' the Dig". When a second pressing of the album was released, this error was corrected. Sometime after June 1973, but before January 1975, a third cover was printed. This has a modified version of the original, made up entirely of the photo of the band members, adding the 'Featuring "Dream On"' text and removing the biography information on the back. This third pressing is the more commonly available version of the LP. Cash Box magazine lists an Aerosmith II (Columbia KC 32045) release in the February 1, 1975 issue. As this catalog number is consistent with a June 1973 date, it is possible Columbia used this number to identify the 'Featuring "Dream On"' cover, but stayed with the original  KC 32005 catalog number on the actual release. In January 1975 Aerosmith was re-issued with the "PC" prefix, so there may have been some confusion as to the correct number. When reissued on CD in 1993 as a remastered version, the original artwork was used.

Recalling the album art, Perry commented in 2014, "Unfortunately the packaging was lame. We didn't even see the cover until the first printing. It was something that Columbia just threw together... The whole thing was sloppy. It marked the start of our education in dealing with labels."

Reception 

The album was not a success when it was released on January 5, 1973. To the band's disappointment, it was not reviewed in Rolling Stone magazine. Moreover, Columbia released Aerosmith at the same time as Bruce Springsteen's debut album, for which they made a greater promotional effort. Critics compared the band unfavorably to the Rolling Stones and the New York Dolls.

In a modern review for AllMusic, Stephen Thomas Erlewine described Aerosmith as "truly an American band, sounding as though they were the best bar band in your local town, cranking out nasty hard-edged rock"; he considered "Dream On" "the blueprint for all power ballads" and the album a worthy debut where the band's "sleazoid blues-rock" sound is fully present but not yet perfected as in the next album. Canadian journalist Martin Popoff described the album as "raw, dirty and steeped with squalid integrity", but observed that "every successive release sounds light years ahead in terms of production, songcraft, maturity, everything".

In an interview to Classic Rock magazine, Guns N' Roses guitarist Izzy Stradlin recalled: "Growing up in Indiana, I loved fucking Aerosmith, man... Smoke a joint, listen to the first record." Aerosmith was considered a big influence on Guns N' Roses and helped shape their sound.

Track listing

Personnel 
Aerosmith
Steven Tylerlead vocals, piano, harmonica; electric harpsichord and mellotron on "Dream On", flute on "Walkin' the Dog", percussion
Joe Perryguitars, backing vocals, second guitar solo on "One Way Street"
Brad Whitfordguitars, first guitar solo on "One Way Street"
Tom Hamiltonbass guitar
Joey Kramerdrums

Additional musicians
David Woodfordsaxophone on "Mama Kin" and "Write Me a Letter"

Charts

Certification

References

Bibliography

Aerosmith albums
1973 debut albums
Columbia Records albums
Albums produced by Adrian Barber